List winners of Russian championship in International draughts.

The annual draughts competition was held in the Russia from 1992. The first championship was held in Pyatigorsk. In 2001 the championship was not held. Championship played round-robin, since 2013 at Swiss system. Since 1998 the championship program included competitions with a shorter time control - rapid and blitz.

Classic

* In 2012 two tournaments were held called the Russian Championship, one in Suzdal, the other in Ishimbay.

References

External links
Results in database KNDB
Hall of fame

Draughts competitions